Nanjō Bun'yū (南条文雄) (1 July 1849 – 9 November 1927) was a Buddhist priest and one of the most important modern Japanese scholars of Buddhism. Nanjō was born to the abbot of Seiunji Temple (誓運寺), part of the Shinshu Ōtani sect (真宗大谷派) of the Higashi Honganji (東本願寺) branch of Jodo Shinshu.

Biography
Nanjō studied Classical Chinese texts and Buddhist doctrine in his youth before being sent to Europe in 1876 to study Sanskrit and Indian philosophy from European scholars, including Max Müller, under whom Bunyu studied in England. While there he met the Chinese Buddhist Yang Wenhui, whom he helped to acquire some three hundred Chinese Buddhist texts that had been lost in China to be reprinted at Yang's printing house in Nanjing. 

In September 1880, Nanjō examined and cataloged a complete edition of the Chinese translation of the Buddhist Tripitaka that had been gifted to the India Office Library in London by the Japanese government. He determined that the India Office Library collection contained the same works as those mentioned in the oldest Catalogue of the Chinese Translation of the Buddhist Tripitaka compiled in 520 AD.

He returned to Japan in 1884 and served as a professor or head of a number of Buddhist seminaries and universities until his death.

Major publications
 (Co-editor with F. Max Müller) Buddhist texts from Japan. Oxford : Clarendon press, 1881–84.
 Nanjo Bunyu (1883). [https://archive.org/details/cu31924023893898 A catalogue of the Chinese translation of the Buddhist Tripitaka], the Sacred Canon of the Buddhists in China and Japan, compiled by order of the Secretary of State for India. Oxford, Clarendon Press
 A short history of the twelve Japanese Buddhist sects. Translated from the original Japanese by Bunyiu Nanjio. Tokyo, Bukkyo-Sho-ei-yaku-Shuppan-sha, 1886.  Internet Archive 
 (Co-author) An unabridged Japanese-English dictionary, with copious illustrations, by Capt. F. Brinkley. Tokyo, Sanseido [1896].
 B. Nanjio (ed.). The Laṅkāvatāra sūtra, Kyoto, Otani University Press 1923 [In Nāgarī] 
 H. Kern; B. Nanjio (ed.); Saddharmapuṇḍarīka; St. Pétersbourg 1908-1912 (Imprimerie de l'Académie Impériale des Sciences), XII, 507 S.; Sert.: Bibliotheca Buddhica, 10 [In Nāgarī] Vol.1, Vol. 2, Vol 3, Vol. 4, Vol. 5.

References

1849 births
1927 deaths
Japanese academics
Japanese scholars of Buddhism
Japanese Buddhist clergy
Jōdo Shinshū Buddhist priests